Leacross is a hamlet in Saskatchewan.

Connaught No. 457, Saskatchewan
Unincorporated communities in Saskatchewan